FC Villa Clara is a Cuban football club based in Santa Clara, Villa Clara Province, which currently play Cuban first division.

Overview
The club, playing in Santa Clara at the Sandino Stadium, and representing the city and the whole province; is de jure based in the village of Zulueta and plays some matches at the Camilo Cienfuegos Stadium.

Achievements
Campeonato Nacional de Fútbol de Cuba: 14
 1980, 1981, 1982, 1983, 1986, 1992, 1996, 1997, 2002–03, 2004–05, 2010–11, 2011–12, 2013, 2016

Current squad

References

External links

Villa Clara
Santa Clara, Cuba